Lilly Broadcasting, LLC is a privately owned American broadcasting company owned and operated by the Lilly Brothers’ Brian Lilly and Kevin Lilly. The company was founded in September 1999 with the purchase of WENY-TV (ABC) and WENY-FM & AM radio. In 2002, Kevin Lilly purchased WSEE-TV (CBS) in Erie, Pennsylvania and have since added the CBS and The CW affiliates in Puerto Rico, Virgin Islands and ABC in the Virgin Islands.

Brian and Kevin Lilly are the sons of George Lilly, whose SJL Broadcast Management (also previously known as the Montecito Broadcast Group) was founded in 1984 and based in Montecito, California.  SJL owns WICU-TV in Erie and the two Companies purchased three TV stations from Gateway Communications in 2000, and four stations from Emmis Communications in 2005.

Lilly Broadcasting most recently with Sankety Advisors purchased KITV (ABC) in Hawaii.  Lilly sold the station to Byron Allen's Allen Media Broadcasting in 2021.

History
WJRT-TV was sold to SJL Broadcast Management in 1989. In 1991, a SJL affiliated partnership, Media Communications Partners Limited Partnership, purchased WTVG.

In 1994, SJL announced the sale of WJRT-TV and WTVG to ABC due to the possibility of WXYZ-TV changing its affiliation to CBS as part of a large swath of television network affiliation changes occurring at the time; the deal was approved by the FCC in 1995 even though WXYZ-TV was able to renew its affiliation with ABC, which caused three of its sister stations to affiliate with the network.

In 2000, it purchased the Gateway Communications stations for $96 million. In 2002, SJL sold off WOWK-TV to West Virginia Media Holdings for $40.5 million. In April 2006, SJL sold off WBNG-TV to Granite Broadcasting for $45 million, this was followed on July 26, 2006 by selling WTAJ-TV and the licensee assets of WLYH-TV to Nexstar Broadcasting Group for $56 million, completely undoing the Gateway/SJL deal.

On July 24, 2007, Montecito announced the sale of all of its remaining stations except WICU (KHON-TV, KOIN, KSNW and KSNT) to New Vision Television, ending the partnership between SJL and The Blackstone Group. The Federal Communications Commission (FCC) granted approval of this sale in late-October of that year, and ownership was officially transferred on November 1.

On March 1, 2009, the last station formally owned by SJL, WICU, transferred its copyrights to Lilly Broadcasting when it merged its news operations with crosstown sister station WSEE-TV. Though SJL still technically exists (and still ostensibly owns WICU), its visible operations have now been subsumed by Lilly Broadcasting.

On November 3, 2010, Broadcasting & Cable magazine announced that SJL Broadcasting made an agreement with Disney to buy back WJRT-TV and WTVG, the two smallest stations in ABC's O&O portfolio. The sale was completed on April 1, 2011 with both stations general manager exiting their positions at change of ownership.  Lilly announced on July 24, 2014, that it would sell both WJRT and WTVG to Gray Television in a $128 million transaction. In 2016, Gray announced that it would operate its bureau in Washington, DC, in cooperation with Lilly.

On May 13, 2015, Hearst Television announced that it would sell KITV in Honolulu, Hawaii and its satellites (KHVO in Hilo and KMAU in Wailuku) to SJL; the deal marks the return of the company to Hawaii, following its prior ownership of KHON-TV. The sale was approved by the Federal Communications Commission on July 10, 2015 and completed on September 1, 2015.

Lilly Broadcasting re-entered radio in 2019 by purchasing the three-station cluster in Warren, Pennsylvania that had previously been owned by Frank Iorio's Radio Partners; Iorio sold off his only other broadcast asset, Pittsburgh's WJAS, to another buyer in 2020. Lilly had previously owned and operated radio stations in Elmira before selling those off a few years after acquiring that cluster.

Stations currently owned or operated by Lilly or SJL
Stations are arranged in alphabetical order by state and city of license.

Television

1 First Warning Weather, a mostly locally originated loop of local weather forecasts. The WSEE First Warning Weather feed also brands as "Erie News Now Plus" in addition to the First Warning Weather brand.
2 WNY News Now's Roku app carries a channel number of 716 but does not broadcast over-the-air with an FCC license.

Radio

Stations formerly owned by SJL
 (‡‡) – Indicates a station that was owned by Gateway Communications prior to its sale to SJL Broadcasting in 2000.

1 WLYH was owned by SJL, but operated by Clear Channel Communications under a time shared agreement.

References

External links
Lilly Broadcasting Corporate Website

Television broadcasting companies of the United States
Radio broadcasting companies of the United States
Entertainment companies based in California
Companies based in Santa Barbara County, California
Entertainment companies established in 1984
1984 establishments in California